Michael Breen may refer to:

 Michael Breen (author) (born 1952), English author and journalist
 Michael Breen (hurler) (born 1994), Irish hurler
 Michael Breen (musician) (born 1960), Canadian musician
 Mike Breen (born 1961), American play-by-play sports commentator
 Mike Breen (pastor) (born 1958), English church leader